Susana Guillermina Manzanares Córdova (19 September 1958 – 6 October 2008) was a Mexican politician affiliated with the Party of the Democratic Revolution. She served as Deputy of the LIX Legislature of the Mexican Congress representing the Federal District.

References

1958 births
2008 deaths
Politicians from Guerrero
People from Iguala
Women members of the Chamber of Deputies (Mexico)
Party of the Democratic Revolution politicians
20th-century Mexican women politicians
Deputies of the LIX Legislature of Mexico
Members of the Chamber of Deputies (Mexico) for Mexico City